Sir John Tottenham, 1st Baronet (6 July 1714 – 2 January 1787) was an Anglo-Irish politician.

Tottenham was the son of Charles Tottenham and his first wife Ellinor Cliffe, daughter of John Cliffe of Mulrankin, County Wexford and Barbara Carr of Cork. He sat in the Irish House of Commons as the Member of Parliament for New Ross from 1759 and 1760, before representing Fethard between 1767 and 1776. On 18 December 1780 he was created a baronet, of Tottenham Green in the Baronetage of Ireland.

He married Hon. Elizabeth Loftus, daughter of Nicholas Loftus, 1st Viscount Loftus and Hon. Anne Ponsonby, on 31 December 1736. Tottenham was succeeded in his title by his only son, Charles Tottenham, who assumed the additional surname of Loftus in 1783 and was created Marquess of Ely in 1800. He also had three daughters including Mary, who married Richard Annesley and had issue.

References

1714 births
1787 deaths
18th-century Anglo-Irish people
Irish MPs 1727–1760
Irish MPs 1761–1768
Irish MPs 1769–1776
Baronets in the Baronetage of Ireland
Members of the Parliament of Ireland (pre-1801) for County Wexford constituencies